La Magdalena Tlatlauquitepec is a town and municipality in Puebla in south-eastern Mexico.

The BUAP has a Foreign Academic Unit there.

References

Municipalities of Puebla